Brian Christopher Broad (born 29 September 1957) is a former English cricketer and broadcaster who currently serves as a cricket official.

As an opening batsman, he played 26 Test matches for England and scored six centuries, together with 34 One Day International matches with a respectable over 40 average. He is known largely for his feats during the 1986/87 Ashes series where he hit three centuries in consecutive Tests, and for his fiery demeanour at the crease.

Broad's children are both involved in cricket. His son Stuart is a fast bowler who, like his father, represents both England and  Nottinghamshire, while his daughter Gemma worked as a performance analyst with England's One-Day squad. Cricket correspondent Colin Bateman noted, "Chris Broad pressed the self-destruct button on a career that promised so much. His lack of self-control at the crease brought a sad end to his reign as England opener at the age of 30, when he should have been enjoying his prime years".

Early life and domestic career
Born 29 September 1957, in Knowle, Bristol to parents Ken and Nancy, Broad suffered from osteomyelitis at the age of 15, which delayed his development as a cricketer. His first-class debut came for Gloucestershire in 1979 and he secured a permanent place in the team the following summer. As well as Nottinghamshire, he also played for Orange Free State. Returning to Gloucestershire in 1993, Broad retired at the end of the 1994 season with a hip injury. He is a past student of St Paul's College, Cheltenham.

International record
Broad made his Test debut for England in 1984, in the second Test match against the West Indies at Lord's. Opening the batting with Graeme Fowler, Broad scored 55 in an opening partnership of 101 runs. Fowler went on to score 106 runs; however, England were bowled out for 286. The West Indies reached 245 in response. England's second innings began poorly, Broad being dismissed for a duck having faced only nine balls, and the West Indies reached the 342 run target set for them thanks to 214* from Gordon Greenidge. Broad therefore averaged 27.50 in his debut Test match.

Broad opened in the next Test match against the West Indies at Headingley, Yorkshire beginning on 12 July 1984, scoring 32 and two. He scored 42 and 21 in the next Test, and four and 39 in the final Test of the series, ending his first series with 195 runs at 24.37. Broad then played one Test match against Sri Lanka, scoring his highest score thus far, 86 in a drawn Test match. Broad did not play for England again until 14 November 1986 during the 1986 Ashes series. He began quietly with eight and 35*, however in the second Test at Perth he scored 162 and 16. He then scored 116 and 15* at Adelaide, 112 at Melbourne and six and 17 in Sydney. He ended this Ashes tour with 487 runs and three centuries from nine innings. He scored centuries in three consecutive matches, only the eighth Englishman at the time to have achieved this feat (five more have achieved it subsequently).

At this time Broad made his One Day International debut in 1986, against Australia in Perth, Western Australia where he scored 76 and England won by 37 runs.

In his only tour of Pakistan in 1987. Broad was severely reprimanded by the tour manager after refusing to walk when given out caught behind in the second innings of the Lahore Test match. Broad had stood his ground and almost a minute elapsed before Gooch persuaded him to go. The game was marred by numerous allegations of unfair dismissals by the umpires. Mike Gatting, the England captain, let his views on these decisions be known, both on the pitch and in the press conference after the day's play.

He was dropped ostensibly for a lack of form, but it was also widely viewed that the England management did not agree with his temperament – he famously knocked his stumps out of the ground after being bowled in the 1988 Sydney Bicentennial Test. He was fined the maximum permitted (£500) by the tour manager. Broad last played for England in the second Test against Australia in 1989, having played in 25 Test matches with a high score of 162 and an average of 39.54. Unusually, he made all of his centuries outside England – four in Australia, one in New Zealand and one in Pakistan.

Broad was a member of the unofficial and controversial 1990 rebel tour to South Africa.

Test official

In 2003, Broad became an ICC Test official, acting as match referee for Test matches and One Day Internationals, including the first match of the World Cricket Tsunami Appeal and serving as match referee in the World Cup Super Eights game between the West Indies and Australia.

Broad was the match referee for the Second Test of the Sri Lanka in Pakistan series, and was in a convoy of vehicles that was attacked by terrorists in the 2009 attack on the Sri Lanka national cricket team. During the attack he reportedly risked his life to protect an injured umpire. He and umpire Simon Taufel subsequently criticised the level of protection provided to officials and players, saying in a press conference, "We were promised high levels of security and in our hour of need that security vanished". Six Pakistani policemen and two civilians were killed during the attack, and six Sri Lankan cricketers were injured.

The Broad Appeal
Broad's second wife, Miche, was diagnosed with motor neurone disease (MND) in spring 2009. She took her own life the following year in July. Together with his children Stuart and Gemma, Broad established the charity "The Broad Appeal" in February 2011 to raise both awareness of and funds for MND.

References

External links

Profile at Jon Holmes Media Ltd.
Official Website of The Broad Appeal

1957 births
Living people
Cricketers from Bristol
England One Day International cricketers
England Test cricketers
English cricketers
Free State cricketers
Gloucestershire cricketers
Nottinghamshire cricketers
Marylebone Cricket Club cricketers
English terrorism victims
Cricket match referees
Cricketers at the 1987 Cricket World Cup